John Albert Carroll (July 30, 1901 – August 31, 1983) was an American attorney and politician who served as a Democratic United States Representative and United States Senator from Colorado. He also served as a special assistant to President Harry Truman.

Early life and education
Born in Denver, he attended the public schools, and during the First World War served in the United States Army (1918–1919). He graduated from Westminster Law School in Denver in 1929, and was admitted to the bar the same year and commenced practice in Denver.

Legal career
In 1933 and 1934, he was assistant United States attorney, and was district attorney of Denver from 1937 to 1941. He was regional attorney for the Office of Price Administration in 1942 and 1943, and served in the Second World War as a commissioned officer in the U.S. Army from 1943 to 1945, after which he resumed the practice of law.

Political career
In 1946 and 1948, Carroll was elected as a Democratic representative to the Eightieth and Eighty-first Congresses (January 3, 1947 to January 3, 1951). Rather than run for re-election to the House in 1950, he was an unsuccessful candidate for election as a Democrat to the United States Senate. He ran for the Senate again in 1954 but was again defeated.

He was a special assistant to President Harry Truman from 1951 to 1952.

He was elected as a Democrat to the United States Senate in 1956, after defeating former United States Secretary of Agriculture Charles F. Brannan in the Democratic primary and former Republican Governor Daniel I.J. Thornton in the general election. He served in the Senate from January 3, 1957 to January 3, 1963. He was an unsuccessful candidate for reelection in 1962, having been defeated by Republican Peter H. Dominick.

He was a resident of Denver until his death. Interment was at Fort Logan National Cemetery, Denver.

References

1901 births
1983 deaths
People from Denver
Democratic Party members of the United States House of Representatives from Colorado
Democratic Party United States senators from Colorado
District attorneys in Colorado
United States Army officers
United States Army personnel of World War I
United States Army personnel of World War II
20th-century American lawyers
20th-century American politicians
Sturm College of Law alumni
Burials at Fort Logan National Cemetery
Military personnel from Colorado
Fellows of the American Physical Society